Francisco Coelho (born 16 January 1962) is a Portuguese weightlifter. He competed in the men's middle heavyweight event at the 1984 Summer Olympics.

References

1962 births
Living people
Portuguese male weightlifters
Olympic weightlifters of Portugal
Weightlifters at the 1984 Summer Olympics
Place of birth missing (living people)